Bokrači (in older sources also Bokreči) is a village in the Municipality of Puconci in the Prekmurje region of Slovenia. It is divided into Spodnji Bokrači (or Spodnja Ves) with the Fartel, Mlinar, Vukon, and Žagar farms, Zgornji Bokrači (or Zgornja Ves) with the hamlets of Talaberov Breg and Žgonjarov Breg, and the hamlets of Duge Gomile and Malačičevi.

Name
Bokrači was attested in written sources in 1355 as Volkarach (and as Bolrah in 1359 and Wolcrach in 1370). The medieval transcriptions indicate that the name is derived from *Bolkrači, presumably a plural form of the personal name *Bolkrač, which is believed to be a hypocorism of a German name with the root *folc- (from which the German name Volker and Slovene name Volkar are derived). The name would thus refer to an early inhabitant of the place. A less likely possibility is that the name is derived from the Slavic hypocorism *Vьlkoračь. In the local dialect, the village is known as Bokreči.

References

External links

Bokrači on Geopedia

Populated places in the Municipality of Puconci